The K136 Kooryong (Romanization: K136 'Gu-ryong'; Hangul: K136 '구룡'; Hanja: K136 '九龍') is a South Korean 36 extended rocket artillery system that was deployed in 1981.

History

The K136 Kooryong 36 extended multiple rocket launcher (MRL) began research and development in 1973 at the Agency for Defense Development (ADD) as a means of responding to the BM-21 122 mm multiple rocket launcher possessed by North Korea, and was performance tested in 1978, and the initial model K136 was deployed in 1981. Later, the K136A1 improved model, which added a stainless steel launch tube and hydraulic system, was deployed to the South Korean Army from 1987 to 1991, and the K33 and K38 rockets with ranges of 36 km and 30 km were developed in 1988. Called Kooryong, the weapons system was designed, tested, and manufactured in Korea for field artillery and artillery. Daewoo Heavy Industries is in charge of production and the rocket was developed by Hanwha.

Possible transfer to the Philippine Army
The Philippine Army has negotiated with the South Korean government for the transfer of its MLRS launchers for the newly activated MLRS Battalions of the Army Artillery Regiment. Three batteries of K136 Kooryong MLRS from South Korea were expected to be delivered in 2020. Delivery of the units has been delayed several times.

Design
The multiple rocket launcher has 36 tubes and fires K30 130 mm and K33 131 mm rockets. There are also improved high explosive K37 rockets for better performance and pre-fragmented HE K37 rockets with warheads containing 16,000 steel balls. The launcher is carried on a KM809AL 6x6 truck.

Operators

Current operators 
 : About 150 units were built.

Future operators 
 : Four batteries worth of units are expected to be delivered with three batteries to be established under the Philippine Army and  one under the Philippine Marine Corps.

See also
 K239 Chunmoo

References

Self-propelled artillery of South Korea
Wheeled self-propelled rocket launchers
Salvo weapons
Multiple rocket launchers
Military vehicles introduced in the 1980s